Henry Skinner (born 8 September 1921, date of death unknown) was a Barbadian cricketer. He played in two first-class matches for the Barbados cricket team in 1941/42 and 1944/45.

References

External links
 

1921 births
Year of death missing
Barbadian cricketers
Barbados cricketers
People from Saint Peter, Barbados